Eucalyptus sieberi, commonly known as the silvertop ash or black ash, is a species of medium-sized to tall tree that is endemic to south-eastern Australia. It has rough bark on the trunk and the base of larger branches, smooth bark above, lance-shaped to curved adult leaves, flower buds in groups of seven to fifteen, white flowers and barrel-shaped or conical fruit.

Description
Eucalyptus sieberi is a tree that typically grows to a height of  but does not form a lignotuber. It has rough bark on the trunk and the larger branches, smooth, white to yellow bark above. The rough bark is thin and flaky on younger trees, but becomes thick and dark grey to black and furrowed with age. Flowering occurs from September to January and the flowers are white.

Taxonomy and naming
Eucalyptus sieberi was first formally described in 1962 by Lawrie Johnson in Contributions from the New South Wales Herbarium from specimens collected by Joseph Maiden in Blackheath in 1899. The specific epithet (sieberi) honours the Czech botanist Franz Sieber.

Distribution and habitat
Silvertop ash grows in forest and woodland, often in pure stands, on shallows soils of low to medium fertility. It is found from south-eastern Queensland through the western slopes and plains of New South Wales, the eastern side of the Great Dividing Range in Victoria to north-eastern Tasmania.

Uses 
The timber is used in general construction, flooring, decking, handles and woodchipping.
One of the major species being converted to wood chips at Eden for export for writing paper production.

Gallery

References 

sieberi
Flora of New South Wales
Flora of Tasmania
Flora of Victoria (Australia)
Flora of the Australian Capital Territory
Plants described in 1962